Merobruchus is a genus of pea and bean weevils in the beetle family Chrysomelidae. There are more than 20 described species in Merobruchus.

Species
These 21 species belong to the genus Merobruchus:

 Merobruchus bicoloripes Pic, 1927
 Merobruchus boucheri Kingsolver
 Merobruchus chetumalae Kingsolver
 Merobruchus hastatus Kingsolver
 Merobruchus insolitus (Sharp, 1885)
 Merobruchus julianus (Horn, 1894)
 Merobruchus knulli (White, 1941)
 Merobruchus lysilomae Kingsolver, 1988
 Merobruchus major (Fall, 1912) (Texas ebony bruchid)
 Merobruchus paquetae Kingsolver
 Merobruchus pickeli
 Merobruchus placidus (Horn, 1873)
 Merobruchus politus Kingsolver
 Merobruchus poryphreus Kingsolver
 Merobruchus santarosae Kingsolver
 Merobruchus santiagoi Ribeiro-Costa, 2007
 Merobruchus sonorensis Kingsolver
 Merobruchus terani Kingsolver, 1980
 Merobruchus triacanthus Kingsolver
 Merobruchus vacillator (Sharp, 1885)
 Merobruchus xanthopygus Kingsolver

References

Bruchinae
Articles created by Qbugbot
Chrysomelidae genera